Cruza is a 1942 Argentine film directed by Luis Moglia Barth.

Cast
 Amelia Bence
 Fernando Ochoa
 Pedro Maratea
 Carlos Morganti
 Elisardo Santalla
 Homero Cárpena
 Alfredo Mileo
 José Castro
 Eduardo Otero
 Billy Days
 Enrique Zingoni
 Iris Portillo
 Pilar Gómez
 Jorge Urban
 Eloy Álvarez
 Francisco Audenino
 Olga Nelly Barcia …Extra

References

External links
 

1942 films
1940s Spanish-language films
Argentine black-and-white films
Films directed by Luis Moglia Barth
1940s Argentine films